Touch and Gone is the fifth album by American rock musician Gary Wright. It was released in November 1977 on Warner Bros. Records as the follow-up to The Light of Smiles. Wright changed his approach to songwriting for the album by collaborating with other writers on six of the nine songs. The album was recorded with only keyboard instruments, aside from drums and percussion.

Touch and Gone failed to achieve commercial success. According to Wright, his manager, Dee Anthony, told him that Warner Bros. were disappointed by the album and considered that none of its songs had hit potential. Having started a U.S. tour in late 1977 to promote the release, Wright was forced to cancel it due to poor ticket sales. The album peaked at number 117 in the United States, while the title track reached number 73 on the Billboard Hot 100 singles chart.

Billboards reviewer said that the keyboards were "beautifully played and arranged" but that Wright appeared to be overly focused on repeating the success of his 1975 album, The Dream Weaver. The reviewer also wrote: "Openings, breaks, arrangements – all are reminiscent of earlier Wright material, yet no cut emerges to break new ground. Vocals and lyrics are exceptional, but the melodies are uninspired." In a review of the "Touch and Gone" single, however, the same publication admired the song as a "spirited rocker" and again highlighted the synthesizer playing. Writing in The Rolling Stone Record Guide, Dave Marsh dismissed Touch and Gone, along with its predecessor, as examples of how, following Wright's breakthrough on The Dream Weaver, he had "indulged himself with increasing flatulence in a spacy, mystical froth of synthesizers and remarkably poor vocalizing".

In his 2014 autobiography, Wright recalls that "Fear had paralyzed my creative efforts on Touch and Gone, resulting in my being overinfluenced by currently successful albums." He says that its failure made him take stock of his career. After spending the New Year with his friend George Harrison in England, where the pair collaborated on the song "If You Believe", Wright returned to India to gain a better perspective on his career.

Track listing
All songs written by Gary Wright, except where noted.

Side one
"Touch and Gone" (Wright, Richard Reicheg) – 3:58
"Starry Eyed" (Wright, Reicheg) – 4:10
"Something Very Special" (Wright, Jamie Quinn) – 3:38
"Stay Away" (Wright, Quinn) – 3:36
"Night Ride" (Wright, Quinn) – 4:10

Side two
"Sky Eyes" – 4:50
"Lost in My Emotions" – 4:04
"Can't Get Above Losing You" (Wright, Christina Wright, Quinn) – 4:02
"The Love It Takes" – 4:10

Personnel
Gary Wright – vocals, keyboards, synthesizer, Moog bass
Bobby Lyle – keyboards
Gary Mielke – keyboards
Richard Baker – keyboards
Peter Reilich – keyboards, synthesizer
Hiroshi Upshur – synthesizer
Art Wood – drums
Clydie King, Venetta Fields, Sherlie Matthews – backing vocals

References

External links
Touch and Gone at Discogs

Gary Wright albums
1977 albums
Warner Records albums